Martha Delgado Peralta (born 26 April 1969) is an environmentalist and the Undersecretary for Multilateral Affairs and Human Rights at the Mexican Ministry of Foreign Affairs. Delgado Peralta was elected to local congress in 2003. From 2006-2012 she served as Minister of the Environment of Mexico City. During her time as Minister of the Environment she helped to develop environmental policies including Green Plan of Mexico City, the Climate Action Program and a bike sharing program called ECOBICI.

References 

1969 births
Living people
Mexican environmentalists
Women environmentalists
Mexican women in politics
Government ministers of Mexico
Party of the Democratic Revolution politicians